Karnak Mountain is a  mountain summit located  west-southwest of Invermere in the Purcell Mountains of southeast British Columbia, Canada. The nearest higher peak is Jumbo Mountain,  to the east-northeast, and The Lieutenants is set  to the northwest. Karnak and Jumbo form a double summit massif which is the second-highest mountain in the Purcells. The first ascent of Karnak Mountain was made August 14, 1915, by A.H. & E.L. MacCarthy, M. & W.E. Stone, and Conrad Kain via the southwest slopes. The peak was named in 1910 by Stone and MacCarthy after Karnak, the Egyptian Temple Complex. The mountain's name was officially adopted June 9, 1960, when approved by the Geographical Names Board of Canada.

Based on the Köppen climate classification, Karnak Mountain is located in a subarctic climate zone with cold, snowy winters, and mild summers. Temperatures can drop below −20 °C with wind chill factors  below −30 °C. Precipitation runoff from the mountain drains into Jumbo Creek which is a tributary of the Columbia River.


Climbing Routes
Established climbing routes on Karnak Mountain:

 Southwest Slopes - First ascent 1915
 Northeast Face - First ascent 1960
 West Face - First ascent 1975

See also

Geography of British Columbia

References

External links
 Weather: Karnak Mountain

Three-thousanders of British Columbia
Purcell Mountains
Columbia Country
Kootenay Land District